Edmund Jennings or Jenings may refers to:
 Edmund Jennings (Member of Parliament) (1626–1691), Member of Parliament for Ripon
 Edmund Jenings (governor) aka Edmund Jennings (1659–1727), Colonial Governor of Virginia, son of above